This is a list of shield bug species recorded in Korea, including both the Korean Peninsula and adjacent islands.

Species on this list have been:
included in a standard database of Korean insects, such as that published by the National Institute of Agricultural Science and Technology,
included in published field guides, or
reported to be present in Korea in a peer-reviewed scholarly publication.

Superfamily Pentatomoidea

Family Acanthosomatidae

Genus Acanthosoma:
Acanthosoma crassicaudum  (굵은가위뿔노린재, gulgeun-gawippulnorinjae)
Acanthosoma denticaudum (등빨간뿔노린재, deungppalganppulnorinjae)
Acanthosoma forficula (녹색가위뿔노린재, noksaekgawippulnorinjae)
Acanthosoma haemorrhoidale (뿔노린재, ppulnorinjae)
Acanthosoma labiduroides (긴가위뿔노린재, gin-gawippul norinjae)	
Acanthosoma spinicolle (붉은가위뿔노린재, bulgeungawippul norinjae)
Genus Dichobothrium:
Dichobothrium nubilum (남방뿔노린재, nambangppul norinjae)
Genus Elasmostethus:
Elasmostethus humeralis (얼룩뿔노린재, eollukppul norinjae)
Genus Elasmucha:
Elasmucha dorsalis (꼬마뿔노린재, kkomappul norinjae)
Elasmucha ferrugata (뾰족침뿔노린재, ppyojokchim norinjae)
Elasmucha fieberi (알락꼬마뿔노린재, allakkomappul norinjae)
Elasmucha putoni (푸토니뿔노린재, putonippul norinjae)
Elasmucha amurensis (극동꼬마뿔노린재, geukdongkkomappul norinjae)
Elasmucha signoreti (등검은뿔노린재, deunggeomeunppul norinjae)
Genus Sastragala:
Sastragala scutellata (노랑무늬뿔노린재, norangmunuippul norinjae)
Sastragala esakii (에사키뿔노린재, esakippul norinjae)

Family Dinidoridae
Genus Megymenum:
Megymenum gracilicorne (톱날노린재, tomnal norinjae)

Family Scutelleridae

Eurygaster testudinaria (도토리노린재, dotorinorinjae)
Poecilocoris lewisi (광대노린재, gwangdaenorinjae)
Poecilocoris splendidulus (큰광대노린재, keun-gwangdaenorinjae)

Family Cydnidae
Adomerus triguttulus (삼점땅노린재, samjeom ttangnorinjae)
Adrisa magna (장수땅노린재, jangsu ttangnorinjae)
Aethus nigrita (둥근땅노린재, dunggeun ttangnorinjae)
Canthophorus niveimarginatus (흰테두리땅노린재, huinteduri ttangnorinjae)
Geotomus palliditarsis (북쪽애땅노린재, bukjjok aettangnorinjae)
Geotomus pygmaeus (애땅노린재, aettangnorinjae)
Macroscytus japonensis (땅노린재, ttangnorinjae)

Family Pentatomidae

Acrocorisellus serraticollis (청동노린재, cheongdong norinjae)
Aelia fieberi (메추리노린재, mechuri norinjae)
Antheminia varicornis (나비노린재, nabi norinjae)
Arma chinensis (중국갈색주둥이노린재, junggukgansaekjudungi norinjae)
Arma custos (갈색주둥이노린재, galsaekjudungi norinjae)
Brachynem ishiharai (이시하라노린재, isihara norinjae)
Carbula humerigera (참가시노린재, chamgasi norinjae)
Carbula putoni (가시노린재, gasi norinjae)
Carpocoris purpureipennis (홍보라노린재, hongbo norinjae)
Carpocoris seidenstueckeri (알락홍보라노린재, allakhongbo norinjae)
Chlorochroa juniperina (향노린재, hyangnorinjae)
Dalpada cinctipes (다리무늬두흰점노린재, darimunuiduhuinjeom norinjae)
Dinorhynchus dybowskyi (왕주둥이노린재, wangjudungi norinjae)
Dolycoris baccarum - Sloe Bug (알락수염노린재, allaksuyeom norinjae)
Dybowskyi areticulata (빈대붙이, bindaebuchi)
Eurydema dominulus (홍비단노린재, hongbidan norinjae)
Eurydema rugosa (비단노린재, bidan norinjae)
Eurydema gebleri (북쪽비단노린재, bukjjokbidan norinjae)

Eysarcoris annamita (보라흰점둥글노린재, borahuinjeomdunggeul norinjae)
Eysarcoris lewisi (큰가시둥글노린재 keungasidunggeul norinjae)
Eysarcoris annamita (보라흰점둥글노린재, borahuinjeomdunggeul norinjae)
Eysarcoris aeneus (가시점둥글노린재, gasijeomdunggeul norinjae)
Eysarcoris guttiger (점박이둥글노린재, jeombagidunggeul norinjae)
Eysarcoris gibbosus (둥글노린재, dunggeul norinjae)
Glaucias subpunctatus (기름빛풀색노린재, gireumbitpulsaek norinjae)
Graphosoma rubrolineatum (홍줄노린재, hongjul norinjae)
Halyomorpha halys (썩덩나무노린재, sseokdeongnamu norinjae)
Hermolaus amurensis (멋쟁이노린재, meotjaengi norinjae)
Homalogonia confusa (산느티나무노린재, sanneuchinamu norinjae)
Homalogonia obtusa (네점박이노린재, nejeombagi norinjae)
Homalogonia grisea (느티나무노린재, neuchinamu norinjae)
Laprius gastricus (두점박이노린재, dujeombagi norinjae)
Lelia decempunctata (열점박이노린재, yeoljeombagi norinjae)
Menida scotti (스코트노린재, seukoteu norinjae)
Menida musiva (무시바노린재, musiba norinjae) 
Menida violacea (깜보라노린재, kkambora norinjae) 
Neottiglossa leporina (반디노린재, bandi norinjae)
Nezara antennata (풀색노린재, pulsaek norinjae)
Okeanos quelpartensis (제주노린재, jeju norinjae)
Palomena angulosa (북방풀노린재, bukbangpul norinjae)
Palomena viridissima (민풀노린재, minpul norinjae)
Pentatoma japonica (분홍다리노린재, bunhongdari norinjae)
Pentatoma metallifera (왕노린재, wang norinjae)
Pentatoma parametallifera (대왕노린재, daewang norinjae)
Pentatoma rufipes - forest bug (홍다리노린재, hongdari norinjae)
Pentatoma semiannulata (장흙노린재 )
Picromerus bidens (알락주둥이노린재 )
Picromerus lewisi (주둥이노린재 )
Piezodorus hybneri (가로줄노린재 ) 
Pinthaeus sanguinipes (홍다리주둥이노린재)
Placosternum esakii (얼룩대장노린재 )
Plautia stali (갈색날개노린재 )
Rubiconia peltata (극동애기노린재 )
Rubiconia intermedia (애기노린재 )
Scotinophara horvathi (갈색큰먹노린재 )
Scotinophara lurida (먹노린재 )
Scotinophara scotti (꼬마먹노린재 )
Sepontia aenea (구슬노린재 )
Troilus luridus (맵시주둥이노린재 )
Zicrona caerulea (남색주둥이노린재)

Family Plataspididae
Genus Coptosoma:
Coptosoma capitatum (큰알노린재, keun alnorinjae)
Coptosoma bifarium (알노린재, alnorinjae)
Coptosoma biguttulum (눈박이알노린재, nunbagi alnorinjae)
Coptosoma chinense (중국알노린재, jungguk alnorinjae)
Coptosoma japonicum (노랑무늬알노린재, norangmunui alnorinjae)
Coptosoma parvipictum (희미무늬알노린재, huimimunui alnorinjae)
Genus Megacopta:
Megacopta punctatissima (무당알노린재, mudang alnorinjae)

Family Urostylididae
Genus Urochela:
Urochela flavoannulata (무늬배나무노린재, munuibaenamu norinjae)
Urochela luteovaria (배나무노린재, baenamu norinjae)
Urochela quadrinotata (두쌍무늬노린재, dussangmunui norinjae)
Urochela tunglingensis (애두쌍무늬노린재, aedussangmunui norinjae)
Genus Urostylis, the Oak Bugs:
Urostylis westwoodi (참나무노린재, chamnamunorinjae)
Urostylis annulicornis (작은주걱참나무노린재, jageunjugeok chamnamnunorinjae)
Urostylis lateralis (뒷창참나무노린재, dwitchang chamnamunorinjae)
Urostylis striicornis (큰주걱참나무노린재, keunjugeok chamnamunorinjae)	
Urostylis trullata (갈참나무노린재, gal chamnamunorinjae)

References

See also 
 Shield bug
 Korean Peninsula

Shield bug, Korea
Shield bug
Shield bugs